Shavi (also Romanized as Shavī and Shevī; also known as Shavīt, Shewīt, and Shīvīn) is a village in Emamzadeh Seyyed Mahmud Rural District, Sardasht District, dezful County, Khuzestan Province, Iran. At the 2006 census, its population was 30, in 4 families.

References 

Populated places in Dezful County